Jani Kautto (born October 25, 1989) is a Finnish ice hockey goaltender. His is currently playing with Kiekko-Vantaa in the Finnish Mestis.

References

1989 births
Living people
Finnish ice hockey goaltenders
Jokerit players
Sportspeople from Vantaa